Beg for Mercy is the debut studio album by G-Unit. The album was released on November 14, 2003, nine months after 50 Cent's successful debut album Get Rich or Die Tryin'.

For this release, G-Unit was composed of rappers 50 Cent, Lloyd Banks and Young Buck, with support from Tony Yayo, who was an original member but was in prison at the time of the album's recording and release. The Game was inducted into the group after recording sessions were already finished.

Background 
"I've been promoting G Unit since before I even had a record deal," says 50. "All the music I put on the mixtape circuit was 50 Cent and G Unit."

As the album was recorded, Tony Yayo was sentenced to jail on charges of gun possession and bail jumping, and so he makes only two appearances on the entire record, on the tracks "Groupie Love", and "I Smell Pussy". His image, which is from a photo taken from the photo shoot for Get Rich or Die Tryin', is seen on the brick wall of the album cover as he could not be photographed due to the jail sentence.

At the time of the album's release, rapper the Game was just placed in G-Unit, therefore he is not photographed, nor does he make an appearance on the album. He does however make cameos in the videos for singles "Wanna Get To Know You" & "Poppin' Them Thangs". He is also mentioned in the lyrics of "Poppin' Them Thangs" when Young Buck raps, "You ain't no Crip like Snoop, / You ain't no Blood like Game."

Sales and certifications 
In its first week of sales, Beg for Mercy sold 377,000 copies. It debuted at No. 3 on the Billboard 200, behind 2Pac's Tupac: Resurrection, & Jay-Z's The Black Album. Its bow was moved up from November 18 to thwart piracy, as was Beg for Mercy. Beg for Mercy then sold 330,000 copies in its 2nd week to peak at No. 2 on the Billboard 200, while moving another 195,000 units in its 3rd week. By April 2008, it had sold over 2.7 million units in the U.S., 9.8 million copies worldwide, and has since been certified 2× Platinum by the RIAA.

Track listing 

Samples (Liner notes)

 "G-Unit" contains samples of "Million Dollars" by Triumvirat
 "My Buddy" contains samples of "Agony or Ecstasy?" by Ennio Morricone, and audio excerpts from the film Scarface.  
 "Wanna Get to Know You" contains samples of "Come Live with Me Angel" by Marvin Gaye.
 "Groupie Love" contains samples of "Simply Beautiful" by Al Green.
 "Betta Ask Somebody" contains samples of "Blue Leopard" by Pierre-Alain Dahan.
 "Footprints" contains samples of "Walk with Me" by Martha Bass.
 "Eye for Eye" contains samples of "Hello Love" by Eden Raskin.
 "Smile" contains samples of "I Too Am Wanting" by Syreeta
 "Salute U" contains samples of "Brandenburg Concerto #1 in F Major (Allego Moderato)" by Johann Sebastian Bach
"Beg for Mercy" contains samples of "Back Down" by 50 Cent
 "Lay You Down" contains samples of "Doctor Marvello" by Klaatu
 "I Smell Pussy" contains samples of "The Greatest Sex" by R. Kelly

Charts

Weekly charts

Year-end charts

Certifications

References 

2003 debut albums
G-Unit albums
G-Unit Records albums
Interscope Records albums
Albums produced by Dr. Dre
Albums produced by Scott Storch
Albums produced by Hi-Tek
Albums produced by Jake One
Albums produced by No I.D.
Albums produced by Eminem
Albums produced by DJ Khalil